Lower Otay Reservoir is a reservoir in San Diego County, Southern California. It is flanked by Otay Mountain to the southeast, the Jamul Mountains to the east, Otay Lakes Road and Upper Otay Reservoir to the north, and the city of Chula Vista to the west.

The reservoir is formed by impounding the waters of the Otay River, behind Savage Dam, completed in 1918, and is also the terminus for the second San Diego Aqueduct, which transports imported water from the Colorado River. The dam and reservoir are owned by the City of San Diego.

History

The area where the Reservoir is located was part of Rancho Janal, and was purchased by E. S. Babcock. Lower Otay Reservoir was originally created in 1897 after the construction of the Lower Otay Dam by the Southern California Mountain Water Company. In 1900, John D. Spreckels purchased the land around the reservoir, and the reservoir was later acquired by a company owned by Spreckels. At the lake was a hunting lodge that was utilized by guests of Hotel del Coronado.

The flood swept away entire farms and buildings, including the Montgomery residence at Fruitland near the mouth of the river, where John J. Montgomery had built his initial series of manned glider designs. The rains were ostensibly the work of the "rainmaker" Charles Hatfield, who had been hired by the City of San Diego to assist in increasing rainfall to fill nearby Morena Reservoir. He was never charged with any crimes. Following this the present Arch-gravity dam was built. In 1934, it was named in honor of Hiram Newton Savage, the city engineer who supervised its construction.

In 1936, Stephen Birch purchased the land around the reservoir, which had been Rancho Otay. His daughter Mary inherited the land and, marrying a former Royal Air Force commander, moved into the former hunting lodge on Upper Otay Lake, Rancho del Otay.

A Curtiss SB2C Helldiver plane was spotted in the lake in February 2009 by a bass fisherman.  On May 28, 1945, it had been on a practice bombing run from a nearby aircraft carrier when a stalled engine forced an emergency landing in the reservoir. Divers examined the plane on July 23, 2009, to see if it could be salvaged for museum display, and it was raised on August 20, 2010.

See also
List of dams and reservoirs in California
List of lakes in California

References

External links

Lower Otay Reservoir - City of San Diego web site

Reservoirs in San Diego County, California
Chula Vista, California
San Ysidro Mountains
Reservoirs in Southern California